Syllitus undulatus is a species of beetle in the family Cerambycidae. It was described by Heller in 1914.

References

Stenoderini
Beetles described in 1914